The 2022 Georgetown Hoyas football team represented Georgetown University as a member of the Patriot League during the 2022 NCAA Division I FCS football season. The Hoyas, led by eighth-year head coach Rob Sgarlata, played their home games at Cooper Field.

Schedule

References

Georgetown
Georgetown Hoyas football seasons
Georgetown Hoyas football